This is a very partial list of rivers of Tanzania

By drainage basin
Rivers of Tanzania listed by drainage basin:

East Coast
Umba River basin
Sigi River basin
Pangani River basin
Kolungazao River
Saunyi River
Luengera River
Mkomazi River
Nyumba ya Mungu Reservoir
Kikuletwa River
Mwanga River
Sanya River
Weruweru River
Kikafu River
Waramu River
Usa River
Themi River
Ngarenaro River
Jipe Ruvu River
Deho River
Rau River
Lake Jipe
River Lumi, Tanzania
Msangazi River basin
Migasi River basin
Wami River basin
Lukigura River
Kiseru River
Mkundi River
Tani River
Mkata River
Mkondoa River
Miyombo River
Ruvu River basin
Mkombezi River
Mbiki River
Musa River
Ngerengere River
Mgeta River
Rufiji River basin
Lungonya River
Great Ruaha River
Lukosi River
Mbungu River
Kizigo River
Njombe River
Little Ruaha River
Kimbi River
Mbarali River
Mlomboji River
Kimani River
Ipera River
Luwegu River
Ulanga River (Kilombero)
Kihansi
Luhombero River
Msolwa River
Ruipa River
Mnyera River
Ruhudji River
Matandu River basin
Mavuji River basin
Mbwemkuru River basin
Lukuledi River basin
Ruvuma River basin
Lukwika River
Muhuwezi River
Msinejewe River
Lukumbule River
Msangesi River
Njuga River

Zambezi basin

Lake Malawi
Kiwira River
Ruhuhu River
Songwe River
Lumbira River
Kilondo River
Lwika River

Nile basin

Lake Victoria
Mori River
Mara River
Ruwana River
Simiyu River
Isanga River
Kagera River

Congo Basin

Lake Tanganyika
Malagarasi River
Rufugu River
Luegele River
Luega River
Msenguse River
Ifume River
Luamfi River
Loasi River
Kalambo River

Endorheic basins

Lake Balangida
Lake Balangida Lelu
Lake Burunge basin
Tarangire River
Lake Eyasi basin
Sibiti River
Lake Kitangiri
Wembere River
Manonga River
Lake Manyara basin
Lake Natron basin
Peninj River
Lake Rukwa basin
Kavuu River
Rungwa River
Zira River
Songwe River (Rukwa basin)
Momba River
Saisi River
Lake Singida
Lake Sulunga basin
Bubu River
Mponde River
Yaeda Swamp
Yaeda River

Alphabetically

G

K 
Kagera River
Kalambo River

L 
Lukuledi River
Lumi River

M 

Malagarasi River
Manonga River
Mara River

P 
Pangani River

R 

Rufiji River
Rurubu River
Ruvuma River
Ruvyironza River

S 

Semu River
Sibiti River
Songwe River

T 

 Tarangire River

U 

Umba River (Tanzania)

W 

Wami River
Wembere River

Z 
Zigi River

References

Tanzania
Rivers